Joseph Hardy (born March 8, 1929) is an American Tony Award-winning stage director, film director, television producer, and occasional performer.

As a television producer, he produced two daytime soap operas in the 1960s:  Ben Jarrod on NBC and A Time for Us on ABC.  He was executive producer of Love Is a Many Splendored Thing, Ryan's Hope and General Hospital.  In addition, he was the executive producer of James at 15/16, a primetime drama that aired on NBC.

In 1967, he won the Drama Desk Award for Outstanding Director for You're a Good Man, Charlie Brown, and won the Tony Award for Best Direction of a Play in 1969 for Child's Play. His 1974 film Great Expectations was entered into the 9th Moscow International Film Festival in 1975.

References

External links
 
 

1929 births
Living people
Drama Desk Award winners
Tony Award winners
American theatre directors
American film directors